Grabie  is a village in Poland located in Lesser Poland Voivodeship, in Wieliczka County, in Gmina Wieliczka. It lies on right (south) bank of the Vistula river, between Kraków and Niepołomice.

References

Villages in Wieliczka County